Benjamin "Ben" Wyatt KBE is a fictional character portrayed by Adam Scott in the TV series Parks and Recreation. The character is introduced in the final two episodes of season two, before being added to the main cast in season three. Ben is initially a state auditor who comes to Pawnee with Chris Traeger to evaluate the town's funds at the end of the second season. He began dating Leslie Knope in the season 3 episode "Road Trip" and married her in the season 5 episode "Leslie and Ben". In the season 7 episode "2017", Ben was named Pawnee's Man of the Year for 2017. In the season finale, it is implied that either he or Leslie eventually became the President of the United States; Leslie taking office would make him the First Gentleman.

Character biography
Ben is from Partridge, Minnesota. When he was 18, he ran for mayor and won on the strength of, in his words, "anti-establishment voter rebellion." However, being so inexperienced, he quickly ran the town's finances into the ground mainly due to the construction of a winter sports complex called "Ice Town", which was never completed. He was then impeached after two months in office. His complete blunder bankrupted the town, caused its unemployment rate to hit 30%, and led to the newspaper headline "Ice Town Costs Ice Clown His Town Crown."  Ben attended Carleton College, where he was the host and DJ for a swing music college radio show called Zoot Suit Wyatt, a reference to the swing song "Zoot Suit Riot" (1997). After becoming an accountant, he and Chris Traeger assumed the nicknames Butch Count-sidy and the Sum-dance Kid, with the names referencing the outlaws Butch Cassidy and the Sundance Kid as well as being accounting puns.

Ben is very serious, mature and work-oriented, and usually does not seem fazed by much of the immature, eccentric behavior from some of the other members of the Pawnee Parks and Recreation Department, primarily Tom Haverford, Leslie Knope, and Andy Dwyer. Ben is often teased by Tom (and, early on, Leslie as well) for his affinity for, references to and vast knowledge in Star Wars, The Lord of the Rings, Star Trek, Game of Thrones and other things considered to be "nerdy". His love for calzones is also a recurring joke in the series.  Ben is shown to have a hard time socializing, and connecting with people by having work as his main focus. During a period of joblessness in season six, he creates a game called The Cones of Dunshire which becomes wildly popular, a fact that he realizes while visiting San Francisco. Initially dejected that he didn't copyright it, his former boss, Barney Varmn, surprises him with the copyright papers.

Season two
When Ben comes to Pawnee, he immediately clashes with Leslie, who is appalled by his unsentimental attitude towards firing people and his penchant for slashing her department's budget. However, when he asks her out for a beer, they begin to show respect for one another. He shares his past as the mayor of Partridge, and that he became a state auditor to prove he can be responsible and eventually run for office again. Their new friendship turns sour when Ben and Chris reveal that the town is virtually out of funds and the government will have to be shut down until further notice.

Despite the seriousness of the problems, Chris presents the situation in an extremely positive light and tries to make all the city hall employees around him happy, leaving the hard decisions and delivery of bad news up to Ben; meaning, Chris is the good cop and Ben is the bad cop in this partnership. Chris and Ben form a budget task force, consisting of several government employees including Ron. When Ron accidentally reveals that Leslie was trying to set up an annual children's concert that was supposed to be canceled on Lot 48 behind Ann's house, Ben tries to shut it down. However, after seeing the effort Leslie put into it, which included having the equipment donated from local vendors, he pays the entertainer Freddy Spaghetti to come back after he booked another event, getting back on Leslie's good side. Ben is also surprised, but quietly pleased when Ron authorizes Leslie to take his place on the budget task force.

Season three
When the government shutdown ends, Ben informs the department that due to the shoestring budget, they will only be on maintenance for the time being. Ben suspects that Leslie is trying to have Ann convince Chris to distribute more funds to the department and confirms his suspicions when he crashes their date at the same time Leslie crashes it, but Ben decides to let it play out. While at a gay club, Ben mentions the failure of the Ice Town project, showing that he used to be just as ambitious as Leslie, but Leslie gives him credit for trying. Ben listens to Leslie's presentation regarding the Pawnee Harvest Festival idea that will allow them to do their jobs properly and bring funds into the department. When Ben asks what will happen if it does not bring in funds, Leslie says they can shut down the department, and Ben allows them to go forth with the festival.

Ben assists Leslie with the festival preparations, and is thoroughly impressed when she gives a flawless presentation despite being stricken with the flu. When Leslie and Ben try to ask the police force to handle security for the festival, Ben is shown not to have very strong social skills, although in this case it could be attributed to the fact that he does not understand Pawnee as well as Leslie. He and Leslie continue to build a strong friendship over their development of the Harvest Festival, and it is implied he has developed an attraction to her when he asks the police chief about her relationship with Dave. He also becomes better friends with Tom, supporting him when he is rejected by a cologne magnate, although Tom does his fair share of ribbing Ben.

While doing the media blitz for the festival, he is continuously asked about his disastrous tenure as mayor of Partridge. After freezing up at the majority of questions asked, he then goes on a furious tirade at a later interview, prompting businesses to pull their sponsorships at the festival and putting the parks department in jeopardy. At the last interview at Pawnee Today, Ben finally stands his ground, stating that everyone does stupid things when they were teenagers and that he has since saved at least five cities from bankruptcy as an auditor. During the festival itself, a series of catastrophes leads Ben to feel he is cursed and leave the festival, returning later to admit he is not over his past. Leslie assures him that he is as responsible for the festival's success as she is, and has the local Native American chief Ken Hotate perform a fake ceremony to remove his "curse."

Following the conclusion of the festival, Chris is installed as interim city manager of Pawnee, and offers Ben a job as assistant city manager, which he eventually accepts. It is implied that he made the decision to be closer to Leslie and that they are mutually attracted to each other, but a new policy of Chris's forbids city employees to date each other, halting a potential relationship between the two.

Since he is staying in Pawnee permanently, Ben decides to move out of the motel where he has been living. Andy and April offer him a spare room in their house, since their previous roommate moved out and left the house to them. Although the two have been living by themselves for only a week, the house is a complete mess with no everyday items like plates or utensils available. Ben decides to teach a reluctant Andy and April how to properly live like adults.

In "Road Trip" Ben and Leslie are sent to Indianapolis to state their case to host the State Little League Championship in Pawnee. They win the case, and go out for a celebratory dinner. There, Ben tells Leslie he likes her romantically, and Leslie confirms she likes him too, but Chris decides to crash their dinner, preventing them from addressing their feelings. At the end of the episode, Leslie approaches Ben to hand him receipts, and he kisses her.

In "The Bubble", Leslie and Ben are officially dating, but are keeping their relationship a secret due to Chris's no-dating policy. They are enjoying what Leslie calls "the bubble", meaning the beginning of a relationship when everything is simple and fun. However, it is suddenly threatened when Ben has a meeting with Leslie's mother Marlene, who wants Ben to approve the purchase of four new school buses despite a difficult budget season. Afraid of ruining the bubble, Leslie initially tells Ben she is not related to Marlene. Right before Ben's meeting, however, Leslie admits Marlene is her mother, making him nervous and causing him to capitulate to all of her demands during the meeting, which makes Marlene consider Ben weak. Leslie trains Ben for his next meeting with her mother. He impresses Marlene so much with his tough negotiation skills that she becomes flirtatious with him. An uncomfortable Ben tells Leslie they should tell her about their relationship, but Leslie does not want to lose the bubble. Fed up, Ben storms into Marlene's office and tells her that he is dating her daughter and asks her to keep it secret. Marlene laughs off the situation and tells Leslie that she approves of Ben.

In the season finale "Li'l Sebastian", Leslie and Ben continue their romance, but are struggling to keep it secret. Ron soon finds out and warns them that if Chris learns about it, he will fire them. As the city prepares for the memorial service for Li'l Sebastian, Pawnee's beloved celebrity miniature horse, Leslie and Ben are caught making out by a maintenance worker, so they send him home in exchange for his silence. Unfortunately, the worker had the propane for Li'l Sebastian's memorial flame, which results in ongoing problems that Leslie and Ben struggle to fix throughout the night. Later, although the memorial turned out to be a success, things get even more complicated when Leslie is approached by scouts looking for potential candidates for elected office. They believe she would be a good candidate for upcoming city council seats, or possibly the mayoral position. With the expected increased media attention on her personal life, the scouts ask whether Leslie has any secret scandals they should know of. She denies this, thus omitting her secret relationship with Ben.

Season four
Though their relationship had become rather serious, Ben and Leslie are forced to break up to avoid a scandal which could derail Leslie's city council candidacy. Ben understands, giving Leslie a "Knope 2012" button he had made. He then starts helping Tom run his business Entertainment 720, where he is shocked at how much money Tom spends without getting any revenue. He also helps Tom charm Joan Callamezzo to try to get her book club to include Leslie's new book, but Joan gets drunk and hits on them. He and Leslie end up sharing lovelorn looks with each other.  Ben is dragged along to Tom and Donna's "Treat Yo Self", where he treats himself to a Batman costume and a good cry over his breakup with Leslie.

While Leslie attempts to keep him in her life, Ben insists that he needs distance from her since being around Leslie is too difficult for him.  Leslie continually tries to spend time with Ben until, through the help of Ben and Ann, she sees that she has been ignoring what Ben wants and doing only what she wants.  Ben and Leslie meet at the Smallest Park, which is supposed to be their last project together.  Leslie apologizes and tells Ben that she will leave him alone if that is what he wants.  Ben responds that he does not want that but he thinks that it is for the best.  As Ben starts to leave, Leslie declares that she misses him like crazy and wants to be with him.  After she asks how he feels, Ben kisses Leslie and the relationship is reinstated.

Later, they confess to Chris about their relationship, and he launches an investigation to check for any possible acts of corruption, as Ben is Leslie's superior. It turns out that in the season three finale, Ben and Leslie had bribed a maintenance worker to keep quiet about them after the worker witnessed them kissing. As that was a possible reason for termination, Leslie was ready to take full responsibility only to find that Ben resigned from his job in order to save hers.

Following his termination, Ben takes some time to "explore his interests" which consists of him remaining in his house and attempting various hobbies like making calzones and stop motion films. His appearance becomes unkempt and after a visit from Chris, he realizes that, despite convincing himself otherwise, he is unhappy without some sort of direction in his life. After Leslie's campaign flops at the ice rink, Ann resigns (eagerly) from being Leslie's campaign manager and Leslie asks Ben to run her campaign given his experience with local politics. Ben takes over the duties of running Leslie's campaign for city council and helps turn the campaign around, making it competitive with Bobby Newport's bid for city office.  Ben manages to secure the endorsement of Pawnee's retiring police chief and improve Leslie's likability at a bowling event (despite the spectacle of having punched a man who called Leslie 'a bitch').  In "Dave Returns", it is revealed that not only is Ben socially awkward around police officers, but he is afraid of them, saying "I am not afraid of cops.  I have no reason to be.  I never break any laws ever because I'm deathly afraid of cops."

Towards the end of the campaign, Ben is offered a job working for a congressional campaign in Washington, D.C.  Initially conflicted, as it would mean several months away from Pawnee, Ben is ultimately convinced by Leslie to take the job.

Season five
Jonathan Banks and Glenne Headly guest starred as Ben's parents in the fifth season. He successfully runs a congressional campaign during the first five episodes of the season. When Ben returns to Pawnee, he proposes to Leslie, and they move into a house together. Later, Ben turns down multiple job offers in Pawnee to join Tom Haverford's company, Rent-a-Swag; concurrently, he ends up working for Sweetums, at a division dedicated to improving their public image by funding charities. He also takes on Andy as an assistant. Ben and Leslie throw a large event designed to help with fundraising for the Pawnee Commons instead of creating a wedding registry. During the event, Leslie tells Ben how much she hates the feeling of not being married to him.  Ben responds by saying that they should just get married that night. After two hours of frantically finishing last minute details, a ceremony ruined by a drunk Councilman Jamm, and bailing Ron out of jail, they hold the wedding in the Parks Department. In the episode titled "Partridge" Ben is invited to return to Partridge, his hometown where he was elected and failed as mayor at the age of 18, for a ceremony to give him the key to the city. Ben falls ill with kidney stones, and when Leslie goes to receive the key in his name, it is revealed to be one big joke to mock Ben for his failure as a mayor.

Season six
After Leslie attacks Sweetums in a press statement, Ben is fired from his job with the company. He then takes on the accountant job he has accepted and declined three times prior. Shortly later though Chris offers him the Job of City Manager of Pawnee because Chris is leaving town and Ben accepts it, becoming the new City Manager of Pawnee and Leslie's boss as she returns to her job in the Parks and Recreation Department. At the end of the episode entitled "Flu Season 2" Ben has a fight with his father who sold their family lake house where Ben had many wonderful childhood memories. He realizes he wants to start a family with Leslie, when he returns home to tell Leslie, he discovers that she is pregnant with their first child. When visiting Dr. Saperstein, they realize she is having triplets.

Season seven
Ben remains city manager, and is planning the Pawnee Bicentennial. This, along with greatly improving the economy of Pawnee, gets him the award for Man of the Year. He and Leslie have had their triplets, two boys and one girl, whom they have named Stephen, Westley, and Sonia. During the final episode of The Johnny Karate Super Awesome Musical Explosion Show, Ben is made a Knight of the Order of the British Empire by His Royal Excellence Lord Edgar Darby Covington, 14th Earl of Cornwall-Upon-Thames and 29th Baron of Hertfordshire. After being contacted by Jennifer Barkley, and with Leslie's full support, he decides to run for Congress in 2018. While campaigning, he earns IOW's Woman of the Year award for giving Leslie room to speak her mind instead of reading scripted speeches. Through a series of flash-forwards in the final episode, it is revealed that Ben's congressional campaign was successful and is now a representative from Indiana for the House of Representatives. In 2025, he and Leslie are both given the opportunity to run as Governor of Indiana, and Ben ultimately decides to let Leslie run, once again managing her ultimately successful campaign. By 2048, it is implied that at least one of them has been elected President of the United States, with Ben wearing a flag lapel pin and being acknowledged first by someone who appeared to be a member of the Secret Service.

Development
Adam Scott departed from his leading role on the Starz comedy television series Party Down to accept the role of Ben Wyatt on Parks and Recreation. Parks and Recreation was one of Scott's favorite shows even before he took the role. When he accepted a role on Parks and Recreation, it was unclear whether Party Down would be renewed for a third season, and Scott said, "I couldn't pass up the opportunity on Parks and Rec for a show that could possibly not exist anymore." Although Party Down co-creator Rob Thomas said he believed the show could continue without Scott, and that the actor would continue to make guest appearances on the show, Party Down was cancelled just three months after Scott departed. Series co-creator Michael Schur said when the Ben Wyatt character was conceived, Scott was considered the "dream scenario" casting choice. As part of Scott's contract with the series, he also signed a first-look deal to develop television projects for NBC.

Scott first appeared in Parks and Recreation starting in the penultimate second-season episode, "The Master Plan", the same episode Rob Lowe joined the regular cast as Chris Traeger. The idea of a character trying to rebuild a government career following a humiliating public failure was one of the original ideas for the protagonist of Parks and Recreation. The idea was originally abandoned in favor of Leslie Knope's character, but those early ideas were ultimately incorporated into Ben Wyatt. Ben's role as a state auditor, and Pawnee's subsequent budget problems, were conceived from global economic crisis and news reports about government services getting shut down around the country. Scott described his character as "someone who jumped in on a moving train" in trying to integrate with the other characters. Ben was expected to become a love interest for Leslie Knope from his earliest conception. In addition to the growing relationship between Leslie and Ben, one of the biggest story arcs for season three was Ben's growing love of the city of Pawnee, which coincided with his romantic feelings for Leslie. Schur described Ben's character as one who never had a firm sense of home due to the excessive amount of traveling with his job, but who gradually grew to appreciate Pawnee due to the optimism and enthusiasm Leslie has for her job.

Reception
The character received extremely positive reviews from critics and audiences alike.

Alan Sepinwall of HitFix called Scott one of the "rare but special" actors who can be both "the sane and deadpan center of the madness, but can also go convincingly, amusingly mad". New York Daily News writer David Hinckley praised Scott's addition to the Parks and Recreation cast, claiming he "gets more of a character here than he does on Starz's entertaining Party Down and makes the best of it". Scott received particular praise for his performance in "Media Blitz", in which his awkward and panicked responses to media inquiries about his past led to what reviewers considered more outwardly comedic opportunities for the character, compared to his usual straight man role. Several reviewers mentioned that Ben Wyatt closely resembled Scott's character on Party Down, Henry Pollard. Ben's character is a politician who found great success at a young age, then suffered a downfall. Henry's character is an actor who became a caterer after his acting career declined. Scott himself has said that he feels they are "vastly different characters and circumstances."

References

Parks and Recreation characters
Television characters introduced in 2010
Fictional government officials
Fictional mayors
Fictional characters from Minnesota
Fictional Democrats (United States)
Fictional members of the United States House of Representatives
Fictional accountants
Fictional knights
American male characters in television